Bumblebee is an unincorporated community in Tuolumne County, California, United States.

Bumblebee is located on California State Route 108 in the Sierra Nevada, near Bumblebee Creek.

References

Unincorporated communities in Tuolumne County, California
Populated places in the Sierra Nevada (United States)
Unincorporated communities in California